Sengalipuram Anantarama Dikshitar (2 August 1903 – 30 October 1969) was a Śrauti scholar and also was a great exponent of the art of upanyasas (discourses) on various subjects in Hinduism. Born in the Thanjavur district as the second son to Sri Subramanya Dikshithar, boy Anantharaman was initiated into the learning of the Vedas under his father Subramanya Dikshithar who was also known as chinna Muthannaval brother of Sengalipuram Vaidhyanatha Dikshithar or Periya Muthannaval. * Paruthiyur Krishna Sastrigal was the first guru for Anantharama Dikshithar. He first had his Aksharabyasam from Krishna Sastri at Muthannavals’s Gurukulam.At a very small age Dhikshithar was blessed by the Jagadgur Shankaracharya of Sri Kanchi Kamakoti Peetam,with a book called "Prasanna Raaghavam" which inculcated Rama Bhakthi on Dhikshithar and developed his interest over Ithihasas and puranas.Then he further studied other Shastras and Vedangas from eminent scholars of repute, astrology from Kadalangudi Natesa Sastrigal who also was his father in law.

Sri Dhikshithar was the first speaker to initiate the Pravachanam at Veda Dharma Sastra Paripalana Sabha at Kumbakonam,an organisation to revive and propagate Vedic knowledge and Dharma Sastra, started by Jagadguru Shankaracharya of Sri Kanchi Kamakoti Peetam Sri Chandrasekarendra Saraswathi Swamigal.

On the divine wishes and direction of Sri Guruvayurappan, the presiding deity, He has performed many Srimadh Bhagavatha Saptaahams at Guruvayur. The Sringeri Sankaracharya Sri Abhinava Vidya Teertha Swamigal too eagerly participated in the Navaaham conducted at Tiruprayar Sri Rama Temple at Kerala, as this was performed as ordered by the presiding deity, Sri Rama Himself. In fact, every one was thrilled to know the personal involvement of the Lord in the Navaaham. His discourse attracted tens of thousands of apt listeners, which was unusual till then. 

The available portions of the recordings of His discourses rendered in public were brought out in cassettes as per the gracious directions of Sri Kanchi Paramacharya. Now, the contents of the tapes have been processed using software and the result is a far improved audio quality. The improved contents are brought now in both the forms of Compact Discs and also of cassettes. The proceeds are to be used for Sri Adhishtaanam of Sri Deekshithar who attained Sidhi on 30-10-1969 (in the month of Thula, Krishna Sashti tithi) after taking Sanyasa on 21-10-1969,within 10 days. Daily poojas are performed at Sri Adhishtaanam at Chinnathirupathi, Salem Town. His divine presence is still felt there where He answers the prayers of devotees. 

Sengalipuram village in Tamil Nadu is famous for its Deekshitars (Smarta Hindus who have performed many Yajnas).

Titles conferred

Among the titles conferred on him were 
Amruthavakvarshi
Upanyasa Charavarthy
Vaideeka Dharma Samrakshaka
Pravachana Dhureena
Veda Yaga Paripalaka 
Ramayana Thathwopadeshaka
Ramaayana
Bhagavatha Kesari
Bharatha Simham
Pravachana Vaakeesa
Sruthi Saakaram

Publications

The following Upanyasams of Anantharama Deekshithar are available as audio cassettes/CDs:

 Srimadh Bhagavatha Sapthaham 
 Sri Sankara Charithram 
 Sri Vishnu Sahasranamam 
 Srimadh Ramayanam 
 Sri Devi Bhagavatham 
 Sri Mahabharatham 
 Narayaneeyam

The following books are available:

 Jaya Mangala Sthothram
 Sri Sundara Kandam

Religious achievements

Dikshitar claimed to have been cured of his leprosy by praying to Guruvayurappan. An ardent devotee of Sri Guruvayurappan, Sri Anantharama Dikshitar made a significant contribution to propagate the Narayaneeyam of Meppattur Narayana Bhattathiri all over the world.

See also
Jayakrishna Dikshitar

References

External links
 Paruthiyur Krishna Sastrigal 
  Gurusmaranam
 Sengalipuram
https://www.pravachanam.com/artists/sengalipuram-anantharama-dikshithar
Sarvam Rama Mayam
 Ramayanam Sastrigal 
 Paruthiyur Krishna Sastrigal 
 Pioneer of Religious Discourse
Sengalipuram

1903 births
1969 deaths
Scholars of Hinduism